Bhumi is one of India's largest independent youth volunteer non-profit organizations.
Bhumi as a platform enables over 30,000 volunteers in more than 12 cities across India for causes like education, environment, animals, community welfare etc. Bhumi helps educate over 25,000 children across India as of 2020.

Bhumi capitalizes on the volunteering force of Indian youth, playing a catalyst in directing India and the youth towards a better tomorrow.
Bhumi has established itself as a front-ranking charity organization that helps poor children to realize their potential, raise their aspirations and recognize their achievements in various fields. Bhumi is one of the top 20 NGOs to work, intern & volunteer for in India

History 

Bhumi was started in 2006 by a few students and young professionals in the Indian city of Chennai. The organization was started by ophthalmologist Dr. Prahalathan KK and his friends Ayyanar Elumalai, Dr. Harishankar, Namasivayam and Prakash Selvaraj. With a passion to do something for the nation, a bunch of young people got together to volunteer to teach children at an orphanage in Chennai. The experience was an eye-opener about the status of the education system in the country. This motivated the co-founders to start Bhumi on August 15, 2006. They started a branch in Tiruchi in 2009 with few students from  Saranathan College of Engineering, and by 2015, the volunteer strength crossed over to 500 students covering all colleges in and around city. By 2016, the NGO was active in 12 cities and was working with over 15,000 children across India.

Approach 

BHUMI Volunteers are primarily college students and young professional working voluntarily to provide education support in children's homes and community centres. The methodology of teaching is mostly informal which incorporates the idea of "learn while you play". In 2016,the organisation team in Tiruchi was designing academic and non-academic programmed for children living in as many as 40 orphanages and  around 600 children were tutored by its volunteers over the weekend in Computer Science, English, Mathematics and Science and nearly 1,200 kids participated in the annual talent show called ‘Nakshatra’. The NGO had also designed a mentorship project for its volunteers called "Lakshya",imparting leadership and social skills and each volunteer spends two hours on teaching, and two hours on project preparation every week. The volunteer team tries to get the orphanage children involved in events like Nakshatra to help them know more about happenings in the world and promotes them to take up higher education or become financially independent after school. The organization had designed a syllabus which runs parallel to the formal school curriculum with exception being it is interactive and teachers are called ‘Anna’ or ‘Akka’, and one volunteer being assigned for every four students for adequate individual attention and its mandatory for aspiring volunteers to be below the age of 30 years.

Programmes 
Bhumi has two core areas of work – Education and Civic Projects

Ignite: Transformational Education 
Ignite is Bhumi's supplementary education programmed for under-privileged children. The programme is delivered during the weekends by trained volunteers of Bhumi. Over 25,000 children are benefiting from the programme as of 2020. The programme consists of English, Mathematics, Science, computers, mentoring, arts, sports and life skills support.

Kanini 
Kanini meaning computer in some Indian languages including Tamil, is Bhumi's computer literacy programmed for children.
Kanini has a well-structured syllabus with courses that cater to children's varying requirements, interests and aptitudes. The basic course package consists of introduction to the Computer, basic software and hardware, Microsoft Office tools and the Internet.

Speak Out 
The Speak Out programme provides quality English and soft-skills education to underprivileged children. The programme builds the communication ability and confidence of children so that they can stand at par with the rest of the world.

Lakshya 

Lakshya is a mentorship programme which pairs underprivileged children with volunteers who act as their mentors and role models. Mentors meet mentees every week and assist them with school work, listen to their problems and support them in challenges they encounter. In the process, mentors instill self-confidence and the ability to solve one's own problem in the children.

e-Lakshya 

e-Lakshya is a mentorship programme which pairs underprivileged children in rural India with Bhumi volunteers across the world who act as their mentors and role models. Mentors interact with mentees through the internet at Bhumi facilitated sessions.

Little Einsteins – Mathematics 
Little Einsteins – Mathematics is an activity based learning programme that focuses on the conceptual understanding and learning. The programme taps the curiosity of children and eliminates the fear of the subject by widening the spectrum of their knowledge.

Little Einsteins – Science 
Little Einsteins -Science is an experiment based programme that teaches the fundamental concepts of science through experimentation, observation and conceptual understanding. The programme helps students understand concepts by doing experiments and helps eliminate the fear of Science.

Yantra 
Yantra is an exciting hands-on programme that helps children learn scientific concepts by building their own robots. The programme helps children develop interest in the STEM fields (Science, Technology, Engineering & Mathematics)

Nakshatra 
Nakshatra, is Bhumi's talent development programme. Nakshatra consists of an Annual inter-orphanage art, sports and science talent Fest to bring out the children's creative talents held across India and a year long talent development programme in arts, sports at shelter homes. The event has been held annually since 2009

. Over 6,000 children participate in Nakshatra every year

Nakshatra, is a two-day talent fest held every year has an array of competitive activities to ensure that children of all age groups from orphanages participate and gain immensely by competing against their peers. The 50 different arts and cultural competitions- including flower arrangement, pot painting, clay modelling, elocution, solo / group dance and song etc. and athletic and sporting competitions like sprint, high jump, shot put, volleyball, chess etc. are structured for various age groups to facilitate maximum participation. The event is peppered with entertainment, games and a science exhibition to keep the children busy even while they were not competing.

Catalyse: Transforming Citizenry 
Catalyze consists of Bhumi's civic projects that engage volunteers in causes like animal welfare, community welfare, disability, environment, health etc. The programmes consisting of one-off and regular volunteering activities engage over 5,000 volunteers each year in over 15 cities across India.

De Step 

The project started in 2020 during Covid Pandemic is aimed at nurturing the potential of lesser-privileged children through dance — is a way to recognize the skills of dancers across the country for a cause and this social project will be curating a nation-wide online dance competition titled Lockdown Showdown 2020. The dance competition had two categories — self-taught dancers and professional dancers, and three age-wise sub-categories — those below 18; above 36, and those between ages 18 and 36. The submissions under the self-taught dancer's category had been posted to Bhumi's official TikTok account and the winners were chosen based on the number of likes their videos received and A special jury was also constituted to evaluate the performances and similarly the professional dancer's entries were shortlisted and shared on Bhumi's Instagram account and the winners were selected by a special panel and also a registration fee was collected from the participants  the proceeds of which were donated towards Bhumi's COVID-19 relief activities. The registration for self-taught dancers was fixed at  Rs 99 and for professionals was Rs 249. Following rules were fixed for competition:

1.Each participant was allowed to post only one video.

2.Time limit of the dance video was fixed at less than 60 seconds.

3.The participants were asked to ensure good quality video and audio are posted and no video editing or after-effects were allowed.

4.It was ensured that the video was original and filmed during the quarantine period.

Clean India in partnership with TikTok

In 2019,TikTok app had partnered with  NGO Bhumi and launched the "Clean India" challenge which trended on it with more than 750 million views and to spread the challenge and rope in  greater number of TikTok users as part of the campaign, Bhumi initiated cleanliness drives in other Indian cities too.

Corporate social responsibility 
Bhumi Supports the Corporate Social Responsibility initiatives of companies like Cognizant Technological Solutions, Dassault Systems etc.

Awards 

 Bhumi is the recipient of the 'Excellence in Literacy' Award 2009 from the Rotary Club.
 Bhumi is the recipient of the 'InDiya Shine Award' 2009 from Great Non Profits International.
 Bhumi is the recipient of the ‘Service Excellence’ Award 2010 from the Rotary Club.
 Vaishnavi Srinivasan, a Bhumi Volunteer has won the Youth Volunteer of the Year Award at the Apeejay India Volunteer Awards 2011.
 Bhumi is the recipient of the ‘award for excellence in the field of education’ 2013 from the Rotary Club

References

External links
 Bhumi.ngo 
 Bhumi.org.in – Old website – Not working 
 Bhumi – Twitter
 Bhumi – Blog
 Bhumi on Facebook

Educational organisations based in India
Children's charities based in India
Educational charities
Non-profit organisations based in India
Organizations established in 2006